Uvea is one of the three official chiefdoms (Royaume coutumier) of the French territory of Wallis and Futuna (the other two being Sigave and Alo) in Oceania in the South Pacific Ocean.

Geography

Overview
Uvea encompasses the whole of Wallis and the surrounding islets. The capital and largest village is Mata Utu, situated on the east coast with a population of 1,029.

Administrative division
The chiefdom counts 3 districts and 21 municipalities:

Districts

Municipal villages

Other villages

History

ʻUvea has probably been inhabited by Polynesians since the 15th century CE and was then part of the Tuʻi Tonga Empire. The two archaeological sites of Talietumu and Tonga Toto are remains from that period.

The kingdom of ʻUvea was founded sometimes in the 15th century and the monarch was titled Tuʻi ʻUvea (king).

April 5, 1887 the island became a French protectorate after queen Amelia Tokagahahau Aliki signed a treaty with France but keeping her royal powers.

In 1888 Sigave and Alo also signed the treaty with France thus creating the "Wallis and Futuna Islands Protectorate".

In 1961 the status was upgraded to being a French overseas territory (territoire d'outre-mer) and in 2003 Wallis and Futuna became a French overseas collectivity (collectivité d'outre-mer), but the local royal powers continue.

See also
 Wallis Island
 List of kings of Uvea
 Dance of Wallis and Futuna

References

External links

 Detailed map of Uvea
 Pictures from Uvea
 About Uvea
 

Chiefdoms and districts of Wallis and Futuna
Kingdoms
Island countries